Attara Kacheri in Bangalore, India is the seat of the principal bench of the Karnataka High Court, the highest judicial authority in the state of Karnataka. It is a neoclassical red-painted stone and brick building in Cubbon Park, located on Dr. B. R. Ambedkar Road opposite the Vidhana Soudha. It previously housed the secretariat of the princely state of Mysore and then that of independent India's Mysore State.

Name 
The Kingdom of Mysore had a secretariat of eighteen administrative departments, created in 1701 by Devaraja Wadiyar II, inspired by the Mughal Emperor Aurangzeb's style of governance. The secretariat was called Attara Kacheri, with Attara meaning 'eighteen' and Kacheri meaning 'department' in Hindustani.

When the secretariat shifted to the building, which was called the Public Offices, in 1868, the building itself began to be called Attara Kacheri. The building was also called 'Bowring Buildings' and 'Bowring Attara Kacheri', after the British commissioner of Mysore, Lewin Bentham Bowring, who ordered its construction.

History 

The eighteen departments of Mysore's Revenue and General Secretariat functioned in Tipu Sultan's summer palace in Bangalore from 1831, during the government of the British Commissioners of Mysore. The palace was found unsuitable due to lack of space, as the offices had grown significantly since they were first shifted there, and because of fears of the building collapsing. Additionally, the palace was at a distance from the British cantonment, and the scattered nature of offices in the palace campus was considered a nuisance.

Plans for a new building housing all offices under one roof were drawn up in 1857, but the project could not proceed because of the Indian Rebellion that year. Further plans were drawn up later, in 1860, but were rejected by the Government of India. A revised plan by Richard Sankey, the chief engineer of Mysore, was accepted, and the Commissioner of Mysore, Lewin Bentham Bowring, ordered the construction of the new building.

The contract for building the structure was awarded to Messrs. Wallace and Co., who sub-contracted the work to Arcot Narrainswamy Mudaliar and Bansilal Ramrathan. Construction began in October 1864. The site, originally chosen by Mark Cubbon, facing the parade grounds of the Bangalore Cantonment, had several boulders and deep streams of water. Overcoming these difficulties, construction was completed in April 1868, at a total cost of Rs. 4,27,980, of which Rs. 3,68,981 was for the construction and the rest for purchase and levelling of the land.

There were two expansions of the building. An annexe was built in 1917 and a major extension of the entire building took place in 1995, in the same architectural style as the original.

Use 

Upon completion of construction, the eighteen administrative departments of the princely state shifted to the building. Apart from the secretariat, the building also housed the High Court of Mysore and the office of the Commissioner of Mysore, and later, that of the Dewan of Mysore.

After Indian independence 
The building continued to house the High Court and secretariat after Mysore acceded to India in 1947. Bangalore became the capital of the new Mysore State, and each house of the Legislative Assembly of Mysore held its sessions in the third floor of the Attara Kacheri, with joint sessions being held in the Bangalore Town Hall. The court occupied the entire building after the legislature and the secretariat shifted to the newly-built Vidhana Soudha in 1956.

The court was renamed the High Court of Karnataka when the name of the state of Mysore was changed to Karnataka in 1973.

Threats of demolition

1950s 
In the early 1950s, Kengal Hanumanthaiah, Chief Minister of Mysore, wanted to demolish the Attara Kacheri, seeing it as a vestige of colonialism. Lacking the requisite permission, he instead ordered the building of the monumental Dravidian-style legislature building, the Vidhana Soudha, at a slight elevation directly opposite the Attara Kacheri. A government committee probing concerns of overspending on the Vidhana Soudha deduced that:"[Hanumanthaiah] was driven primarily by the desire to vanquish visually the Attara Kacheri building, a symbol of imperial power, in length, height and majesty."

1980s 

On 24 March 1982, the Government of Karnataka approved the demolition of the Attara Kacheri and the construction of a new court building on the site. A public interest litigation, or PIL, was filed in the Karnataka High Court, pleading for the demolition to be cancelled. The case was heard in the same building that was slated to be demolished. The petitioners pleaded that the Attara Kacheri was  "...precious cultural heritage and a part of an ancient legacy which any city would treasure... [the building is] a symbolic connecting chord for the future, and its destruction snaps an emotional experience vital to a sense of belonging to this beautiful city."The state government defended its decision, saying that the building was in need of expensive repairs, and even then would be inadequate for expanded uses. The High Court struck down the petition on the basis that it could not change the law to make it a duty for the government to protect heritage buildings. Hearing the appeal against the High Court decision, the Supreme Court of India asked the state government to reconsider its proposal. In 1985, the proposal to demolish the building was dropped, and repair and expansion work was begun.

Architecture 
The Attara Kacheri has two storeys. The walls of the bottom story are built of gneiss stone in chunam (a kind of Indian cement), and those of the upper story are built of brick in chunam. The main structure of the building is surrounded on all sides by porticoes and verandahs. The entire building is surfaced with plaster and painted with red ochre. The verandahs prevent direct sunlight from reaching much of the main body of the building; despite this, the rooms are well-lit and well-ventilated.

The building is built in the neoclassical style, with Ionic porticoes on the facades of every wing, and with the wings connected by arcade-style lengths. The porticoes on both sides of the central wing each have twelve Ionic columns. The tops of the roof tiles of the wings are modelled in the style of Grecian tiles.

References 

Bangalore Urban district
Buildings and structures designed by Richard Hieram Sankey